Nicolas Saint-Ruf (born 24 October 1992) is a professional footballer who plays for Ligue 2's US Orléans, as a central defender. Born in mainland France, he plays for the Guadeloupe national team.

International career
Born in France, Saint-Ruf is of Guadeloupean descent. He was called up to represent the Guadeloupe national team for a pair of friendlies in March 2022.

References

External links
 

1992 births
Living people
Footballers from Rouen
Association football defenders
Guadeloupean footballers
Guadeloupe international footballers
French footballers
French people of Guadeloupean descent
Ligue 1 players
Ligue 2 players
Championnat National players
RC Lens players
US Orléans players
Montpellier HSC players
SC Bastia players
AS Nancy Lorraine players
Football Bourg-en-Bresse Péronnas 01 players